Joseph Hilaire Pierre René Belloc (27 July 187016 July 1953) was a Franco-English writer and historian of the early twentieth century. Belloc was also an orator, poet, sailor, satirist, writer of letters, soldier, and political activist. His Catholic faith had a strong effect on his works.

Belloc became a naturalised British subject in 1902 while retaining his French citizenship. While attending Oxford, he served as President of the Oxford Union.  From 1906 to 1910, he served as one of the few openly Catholic members of the British Parliament. 

Belloc was a noted disputant, with a number of long-running feuds.  He was also a close friend and collaborator of G. K. Chesterton. George Bernard Shaw, a friend and frequent debate opponent of both Belloc and Chesterton, dubbed the pair the "Chesterbelloc".  

Belloc's writings encompassed religious poetry and comic verse for children. His widely sold Cautionary Tales for Children included "Jim, who ran away from his nurse, and was eaten by a lion" and "Matilda, who told lies and was burned to death". He wrote historical biographies and numerous travel works, including The Path to Rome (1902).

Family and career

Family 
Belloc was born in La Celle-Saint-Cloud, France to a French father, Louis Belloc (1830–1872) and an English mother. His sister Marie Adelaide Belloc Lowndes also became a writer.

Belloc's mother Bessie Rayner Parkes (1829–1925) was a writer, activist and an advocate for women's equality, a co-founder of the English Woman's Journal and the Langham Place Group. As an adult, Belloc campaigned against women's suffrage as a member of the Women's National Anti-Suffrage League.

Belloc's maternal grandfather was Joseph Parkes (1796–1865). Belloc's grandmother, Elizabeth Rayner Priestley (1797–1877), was born in the United States, a granddaughter of Joseph Priestley.

In 1867, Bessie Rayner Parkes married attorney Louis Belloc, son of Jean-Hilaire Belloc. In 1872, five years after they wed, Louis died but not before being wiped out financially in a stock market crash. The young widow then brought her children back to England.

Early life 
Belloc grew up in England; his boyhood was spent in Slindon, Sussex.  He wrote about his home in poems such as  "West Sussex Drinking Song", "The South Country", and  "Ha'nacker Mill". After graduating from John Henry Newman's Oratory School in Edgbaston, Birmingham.

Courtship, marriage, and premature death of his wife 
In September of 1889, Belloc's sister Marie made the accidental acquaintance of a Catholic widow, Mrs. Ellen Hogan, who was travelling from California on a European tour, with two of her children, her daughters, Elizabeth and Elodie. The travellers were both devoutly Catholic and keenly interested in literature, and Marie arranged a visit with her mother, Bessie, who in turn arranged an audience with Cardinal Henry Manning.  These acts of generosity cemented a strong friendship, further deepened when Marie and Bessie accompanied the Hogans on their tour of France, visiting Paris with them.  Hilaire was absent touring the French provinces as a correspondent for The Pall Mall Gazette, but when the Hogans stopped back in London on their return from another European trip the following year, Belloc met Elodie for the first time, and was smitten.  

Shortly after this meeting, Ellen Hogan was called back to California prematurely to take care of another of her children who was stricken with illness. She left her two daughters, who wished to remain in London, under the care of the Belloc family, and, Bessie asked her own son to squire the Hogan daughters around London.  Belloc's interest in Elodie grew more fervid by the day.  This was the beginning of a long, intercontinental, and star-crossed courtship, made all the more difficult by the opposition of Elodie's mother, who wished Elodie to enter the convent, and Hilaire's mother, who thought her son was too young to marry.  Belloc pursued Elodie with letters, and, after her return to the United States, in 1891, he pursued her in person.  

The impoverished Belloc, still only twenty years old, sold nearly everything he had to purchase a steamship ticket to New York, ostensibly to visit relatives in Philadelphia.  Belloc's true reason for the trek to America became apparent when, after spending a few days in Philadelphia, he began to make his way across the American continent.  Part of his journey was by train, but when the money ran out, Belloc just walked. An athletic man who hiked extensively in Britain and Europe, Belloc made his way on foot for a significant part of the 2870 miles from Philadelphia to San Francisco. While walking, he paid for lodging at remote farm houses and ranches by sketching the owners and reciting poetry.

Hilaire's first letter on his arrival in San Francisco is effervescent, happy to see Elodie and full of hopes for their future, but his manifestly zealous courtship was to go unrewarded.  The joy he felt at seeing Elodie soon gave way to disappointment, when the apparently insurmountable opposition of her mother to the marriage manifested itself.  After a stay of only a few weeks, far shorter than the time he had spent in his journey to California, the crestfallen Belloc made his way back across the United States, after a fruitless journey of thousands of miles. His biographer, Joseph Pearce, compares the return to Napoleon's long, winter retreat from Moscow. When Belloc finally reached the East Coast at Montclair, New Jersey, he received a letter from Elodie on April 30, 1891, definitively rejecting him in favour of a religious vocation; the steamship trip home was tainted with despair.  

The gloomy Belloc threw himself into restless activity.  Determined to fulfill the obligation of military service necessary to retain his French citizenship, Belloc served his term with an artillery regiment near Toul in 1891.  While he was serving in France, Elodie's mother Ellen died, removing a significant obstacle to Belloc's hopes, but, Elodie, although torn between her affection for Hilaire and her desire to serve God in the religious life, was unwilling to cross her mother's wishes so soon after her mother's untimely death and persisted in refusing Belloc's advances.  

After his year of service was concluded, still pining for and writing to Elodie, he took the entrance exam to Oxford and matriculated to Balliol College, Oxford, in January of 1893.  Belloc would later write in a poem

While at Oxford he was bestowed by his fellow students with a great honour: he was elected and served as President of the Oxford Union, the University debating society. He and another undergraduate, Anthony Henley, also achieved the record-breaking and amazing athletic feat of walking from Carfax Tower in Oxford, to Marble Arch in London, a distance of some 55 miles, more than double that of a marathon, in only 11 and 1/2 hours. He graduated as a history scholar, securing a first-class honours degree in June of 1895.  

That autumn, Elodie, finally took the plunge into religious life and joined the Sisters of Charity at Emmitsburg, Maryland, as a postulant. She left a month later, writing to Belloc that she had failed in her religious vocation.  In March of 1896, having secured financing as an Oxford Extension lecturer in Philadelphia, Germantown, Baltimore and New Orleans, Belloc took a steamship to New York, and started making his way to Elodie in California. He expected to receive letters from her on his journey, but received none. To his shock and dismay, when he finally arrived in California in May, he discovered Elodie was deathly ill, worn out by the stress of the previous year.  Belloc, thinking that after all their suffering, he and his beloved would be denied one another by her death, also collapsed.  Over the next few weeks, however, Elodie recovered and  
after a tumultuous, six-year courtship,  Belloc and Elodie were married at St. John the Baptist Catholic church in Napa, California, on June 15, 1896. They settled initially in Oxford.

In 1906, Belloc purchased land and a house called King's Land at Shipley in the United Kingdom. The couple had five children before Elodie's untimely death on the Feast of the Purification, February 2, 1914, likely from cancer. She was only 45 years old, and Belloc, at age 43, had more than 40 years of life ahead of him.  He wore mourning garb for the rest of his life and kept her room as she had left it. 

Five years later, his son Louis was killed in 1918 while serving in the Royal Flying Corps in northern France. Belloc placed a memorial tablet at the nearby Cambrai Cathedral. It is in the same side chapel as the icon Our Lady of Cambrai.

Later years
On 2 April 1941, Belloc's son Peter Gilbert Marie Sebastian Belloc died at age 36 of pneumonia. He fell ill while on active service with the 5th Battalion, Royal Marines in Scotland. He is buried in West Grinstead at Our Lady of Consolation and St. Francis churchyard.

In 1937, Belloc was invited to be a visiting professor at Fordham University in New York City by university president Robert Gannon. Belloc delivered a series of lectures at Fordham which he completed in May of that year. The experience ended up leaving him physically exhausted, and he considered stopping the lectures early.

Death and legacy 
In 1941, Belloc suffered a stroke and never recovered from its effects. In the same year, he also suffered burns and shock after falling on his fireplace. He died on 16 July 1953 at Mount Alvernia Nursing Home in Guildford, Surrey.

Belloc was buried at the Shrine Church of Our Lady of Consolation and St Francis at West Grinstead, where he had regularly attended Mass as a parishioner. His estate was probated at £7,451. At his funeral Mass, homilist Monsignor Ronald Knox observed, "No man of his time fought so hard for the good things". Boys from the Choir and Sacristy of Worth Preparatory School sang and served at the Mass.

Recent biographies of Belloc have been written by A. N. Wilson and Joseph Pearce. Jesuit political philosopher James Schall's Remembering Belloc was published by St. Augustine Press in September 2013. A memoir of Belloc was written by Henry Edward George Rope.

Political career
At Balliol College, Belloc served as president of the Oxford Union. He went into politics after he became a naturalised British subject. A great disappointment in his life was his failure to gain a fellowship of All Souls College, Oxford in 1895. This failure may have been caused in part by his producing a small statue of the Virgin and placing it before him on the table during the interview for the fellowship.

From 1906 to 1910, Belloc was a Liberal Party Member of Parliament for Salford South. During one campaign speech, he was asked by a heckler if he was a "papist". He responded:
Gentlemen, I am a Catholic. As far as possible, I go to Mass every day. This [taking a rosary out of his pocket] is a rosary. As far as possible, I kneel down and tell these beads every day. If you reject me on account of my religion, I shall thank God that He has spared me the indignity of being your representative. The crowd cheered and Belloc won the election, despite his Catholic faith. He retained his seat in the first 1910 election but did not stand in December 1910.

Belloc's only period of steady employment after that was from 1914 to 1920 as editor of Land and Water. Otherwise he lived by his writing and was often financially insecure.

In controversy and debate

Belloc first came to public attention shortly after arriving at Balliol College, Oxford as a recent French army veteran. Attending his first debate of the Oxford Union Debating Society, he saw that the affirmative position was wretchedly and half-heartedly defended. As the debate drew to its conclusion and the division of the house was called, he rose from his seat in the audience, and delivered a vigorous, impromptu defence of the proposition. Belloc won that debate from the audience, as the division of the house then showed, and his reputation as a debater was established. He was later elected president of the Union. He held his own in debates there with F. E. Smith and John Buchan, the latter a friend.

In the 1920s, Belloc attacked H. G. Wells's The Outline of History.  Belloc criticised what he termed Wells‘s secular bias and his belief in evolution by means of natural selection, a theory that Belloc asserted had been completely discredited. Wells remarked that "Debating Mr. Belloc is like arguing with a hailstorm". Belloc's review of Outline of History observed that Wells's book was a powerful and well-written volume, "up until the appearance of Man, that is, somewhere around page seven". Wells responded with a small book, Mr. Belloc Objects. Not to be outdone, Belloc followed with, "Mr. Belloc Still Objects".

G. G. Coulton wrote Mr. Belloc on Medieval History in a 1920 article. After a long simmering feud, Belloc replied with a booklet, The Case of Dr. Coulton, in 1938.

Belloc's style during later life fulfilled the nickname he received in childhood, Old Thunder. Belloc's friend Lord Sheffield described his provocative personality in a preface to The Cruise of the Nona.

Hobbies
During his later years, Belloc would sail when he could afford to do so and became a well-known yachtsman. He won many races and was on the French sailing team.

In the early 1930s, he was given an old pilot cutter called Jersey. He sailed this for some years around the coasts of England, with the help of younger men. One sailor, Dermod MacCarthy, wrote a book about it, called Sailing with Mr Belloc.

Writing 

Belloc wrote over 150 books, the subjects ranging from warfare to poetry to the many current topics of his day. He has been called one of the Big Four of Edwardian Letters, along with H. G. Wells, George Bernard Shaw, and G. K. Chesterton, all of whom debated with each other into the 1930s. Belloc was closely associated with Chesterton, and Shaw coined the term "Chesterbelloc" for their partnership. Belloc was co-editor with Cecil Chesterton of the literary periodical the Eye-Witness.

Asked once why he wrote so much, Belloc responded, "Because my children are howling for pearls and caviar." Belloc observed that "The first job of letters is to get a canon", that is, to identify those works a writer sees as exemplary of the best of prose and verse. For his own prose style, he said he aspired to be as clear and concise as "Mary had a little lamb."

Essays and travel writing

In 1902, Belloc published The Path to Rome, an account of a walking pilgrimage from Central France across the Alps to Rome. The Path to Rome contains descriptions of the people and places he encountered, his drawings in pencil and in ink of the route, humour, poesy. In 1909, Belloc published The Pyrenees, providing many details of that region.

As an essayist he was one of a small group (with Chesterton, E. V. Lucas and Robert Lynd) of popular writers.

Poetry

His Cautionary Tales for Children, humorous poems with an implausible moral, illustrated by Basil Temple Blackwood (signing as "B.T.B.") and later by Edward Gorey, are the most widely known of his writings. Supposedly for children, they, like Lewis Carroll's works, are more to adult and satirical tastes: "Henry King, Who chewed bits of string and was early cut off in dreadful agonies". A similar poem tells the story of "Rebecca, who slammed doors for fun and perished miserably".

The tale of "Matilda who told lies and was burned to death" was adapted into the play Matilda Liar! by Debbie Isitt. Quentin Blake, the illustrator, described Belloc as at one and the same time the overbearing adult and mischievous child. Roald Dahl was a follower. But Belloc has broader if sourer scope. For example, with Lord Lundy (who was "far too freely moved to Tears"):

leading up to

instead, Lundy is condemned to the ultimate political wilderness:

Of more weight is Belloc's Sonnets and Verse, a volume that deploys the same singing and rhyming techniques of his children's verses. Belloc's poetry is often religious, often romantic; throughout The Path to Rome he writes in spontaneous song.

History, politics, and economics

Three of his best-known non-fiction works are The Servile State (1912), Europe and Faith (1920) and The Jews (1922).

From an early age Belloc knew Cardinal Henry Edward Manning, who was responsible for the conversion of his mother to Roman Catholicism.  In The Cruise of the "Nona" (1925), he mentions a "profound thing" that Manning said to him when he was just twenty years old: "All human conflict is ultimately theological." What Manning meant, Belloc said, is "that all wars and revolutions, and all decisive struggles between parties of men arise from a difference in moral and transcendental doctrine." Belloc adds that he never met any man, "arguing for what should be among men, but took for granted as he argued that the doctrine he consciously or unconsciously accepted was or should be a similar foundation for all mankind. Hence battle." Manning's involvement in the London Dock Strike of 1889 made a major impression on Belloc and his view of politics, according to biographer Robert Speaight. He became a trenchant critic both of capitalism and of many aspects of socialism.

With others (G. K. Chesterton, Cecil Chesterton, Arthur Penty) Belloc had envisioned the socioeconomic system of distributism. In The Servile State, written after his party-political career had come to an end, and other works, he criticised the modern economic order and parliamentary system, advocating distributism in opposition to both capitalism and socialism. Belloc made the historical argument that distributism was not a fresh perspective or program of economics but rather a proposed return to the economics that prevailed in Europe for the thousand years when it was Catholic. He called for the dissolution of Parliament and its replacement with committees of representatives for the various sectors of society, an idea that was also popular among fascists, under the name of corporatism.

He contributed an article on "Land-Tenure in the Christian Era" to the Catholic Encyclopedia.

Belloc held republican views, but became increasingly sympathetic to monarchism as he grew older. In his youth, Belloc had initially been loyal to the nature of French republicanism, seeing it as a patriotic duty. Michael Hennessy, Chairman of the Hilaire Belloc Society, wrote that "In some respects, Belloc remained a republican until his death, but increasingly realized that there were not enough republicans to make a republic function effectively. Belloc thus felt that monarchy was the most practicable, superior form of government." Belloc explores some of these ideas in his work Monarchy: A Study of Louis XIV. Within it, Belloc also wrote that democracy "is possible only in small states, and even these must enjoy exceptional defences, moral or material, if they are to survive."

With these linked themes in the background, he wrote a long series of contentious biographies of historical figures, including Oliver Cromwell, James II, and Napoleon. They show him as an ardent proponent of orthodox Catholicism and a critic of many elements of the modern world.

Outside academe, Belloc was impatient with what he considered axe-grinding histories, especially what he called "official history." Joseph Pearce notes also Belloc's attack on the secularism of H. G. Wells's popular Outline of History:

Belloc objected to his adversary's tacitly anti-Christian stance, epitomized by the fact that Wells had devoted more space in his "history" to the Persian campaign against the Greeks than he had given to the figure of Christ.

He wrote also substantial amounts of military history. In alternative history, he contributed to the 1931 collection If It Had Happened Otherwise edited by Sir John Squire.

Reprints
Ignatius Press of California and IHS Press of Virginia have reissued Belloc. TAN Books of Charlotte, North Carolina, publishes a number of Belloc's works, particularly his historical writings.

Religion

One of Belloc's most famous statements was "the faith is Europe and Europe is the faith"; those views were expressed in many of his works from the period 1920 to 1940. These are still cited as exemplary of Catholic apologetics. They have also been criticised, for instance by comparison with the work of Christopher Dawson during the same period.

As a young man, Belloc moved away from Catholicism. However, he later stated that a spiritual event, which he never discussed publicly, prompted his return to it. Belloc alludes to this return to Catholicism in a passage in The Cruise of the Nona.

According to his biographer A. N. Wilson (Hilaire Belloc, Hamish Hamilton), Belloc never wholly apostatised from the faith (ibid p. 105). The momentous event is fully described by Belloc in The Path to Rome (pp. 158–61). It took place in the French village of Undervelier at the time of Vespers. Belloc said of it, "not without tears", "I considered the nature of Belief" and "it is a good thing not to have to return to the Faith". (See Hilaire Belloc by Wilson at pp. 105–06.) Belloc believed that the Catholic Church provided hearth and home for the human spirit. More humorously, his tribute to Catholic culture can be understood from his well-known saying, "Wherever the Catholic sun does shine, there's always laughter and good red wine."

Belloc had a disparaging view of the Church of England, and used sharp words to describe heretics, such as, "Heretics all, whoever you may be/ In Tarbes or Nimes or over the sea/ You never shall have good words from me/ Caritas non-conturbat me". Indeed, in his "Song of the Pelagian Heresy" he described how the Bishop of Auxerre, "with his stout Episcopal staff/ So thoroughly thwacked and banged/ The heretics all, both short and tall/ They rather had been hanged".

Belloc sent his son Louis to Downside School (1911–1915). Louis's biography and death in August 1918 is recorded in "Downside and the War".

On Islam
Belloc's 1937 book The Crusades: the World's Debate, he wrote, 

In The Great Heresies (1938), Belloc argued that although "Muslim culture happens to have fallen back in material applications; there is no reason whatever why it should not learn its new lesson and become our equal in all those temporal things which now alone give us our superiority over it—whereas in Faith we have fallen inferior to it."

Belloc continued:

There is no reason why its recent inferiority in mechanical construction, whether military or civilian, should continue indefinitely.  Even a slight accession of material power would make the further control of Islam by an alien culture difficult.  A little more and there will cease that which our time has taken for granted, the physical domination of Islam by the disintegrated Christendom we know. Belloc considered that Islam was permanently intent on destroying the Christian faith, as well as the West, which Christendom had built. In The Great Heresies, Belloc grouped the Protestant Reformation together with Islam as one of the major heresies threatening the "Universal Church".

Accusations of antisemitism

Belloc's writings were at times supportive of anti-Semitism and other times condemnatory of it.

Belloc took a leading role in denouncing the Marconi scandal of 1912. Belloc emphasized that key players in both the government and the Marconi corporation had been Jewish. American historian Todd Endelman identifies Catholic writers as central critics. In his opinion:The most virulent attacks in the Marconi affair were launched by Hilaire Belloc and the brothers Cecil and G. K. Chesterton, whose hostility to Jews was linked to their opposition to liberalism, their backward-looking Catholicism, and the nostalgia for a medieval Catholic Europe that they imagined was ordered, harmonious, and homogeneous. The Jew baiting at the time of the Boer War and the Marconi scandal was linked to a broader protest, mounted in the main by the Radical wing of the Liberal Party, against the growing visibility of successful businessmen in national life and their challenges to what were seen as traditional English values.A. N. Wilson's biography expresses the belief that Belloc tended to allude to Jews negatively in conversation, sometimes obsessively. Anthony Powell mentions in his review of that biography that in his view Belloc was thoroughly anti-Semitic, at all but a personal level.

In The Cruise of the Nona, Belloc reflected equivocally on the Dreyfus Affair after thirty years. Norman Rose's book The Cliveden Set (2000) asserts that Belloc 'was moved by a deep vein of hysterical anti-semitism'.In his 1922 book, The Jews, Belloc argued that "the continued presence of the Jewish nation intermixed with other nations alien to it presents a permanent problem of the gravest character", and that the "Catholic Church is the conservator of an age-long European tradition, and that tradition will never compromise with the fiction that a Jew can be other than a Jew. Wherever the Catholic Church has power, and in proportion to its power, the Jewish problem will be recognized to the full."Robert Speaight cited a letter by Belloc in which he condemned Nesta Webster because of her accusations against "the Jews". In February 1924, Belloc wrote to an American Jewish friend regarding an anti-Semitic book by Webster. Webster had rejected Christianity, studied Eastern religions, accepted the supposed Hindu concept of the equality of all religions and was fascinated by theories of reincarnation and ancestral memory. Speaight also points out that when faced with anti-Semitism in practice—as at elitist country clubs in the United States before World War II—he voiced his disapproval. Belloc also condemned Nazi anti-Semitism in The Catholic and the War (1940).

Sussex
Belloc grew up in Slindon and spent most of his life in West Sussex. He always wrote of Sussex as if it were the crown of England and the western Sussex Downs the jewel in that crown. He loved Sussex as the place where he was brought up, considering it his earthly "spiritual home".

Belloc wrote several works about Sussex including Ha'nacker Mill, The South Country, the travel guide Sussex (1906) and The County of Sussex (1936). One of his best-known works relating to Sussex is The Four Men: a Farrago (1911), in which the four characters, each aspects of Belloc's personality, travel on a pilgrimage across the county from Robertsbridge to Harting. The work has influenced others including musician Bob Copper, who retraced Belloc's steps in the 1980s.

Belloc was also a lover of Sussex songs and wrote lyrics for some songs which have since been put to music. Belloc is remembered in an annual celebration in Sussex, known as Belloc Night, that takes place on the writer's birthday, 27 July, in the manner of Burns Night in Scotland. The celebration includes reading from Belloc's work and partaking of a bread and cheese supper with pickles.

In the media
 Stephen Fry has recorded an audio collection of Belloc's children's poetry.
 The composer Peter Warlock set many of Belloc's poems to music.
 Peter Ustinov recorded Belloc's The Cautionary Tales in 1968 for the Musical Heritage Society (MHC 9249M).
 A well-known parody of Belloc by Sir John Squire, intended as a tribute, is Mr. Belloc's Fancy.
 Syd Barrett used Cautionary Tales as the basis for the song "Matilda Mother" from the 1967 album The Piper at the Gates of Dawn.
 King's Mill, Shipley, once owned by Belloc, was used in the British TV drama Jonathan Creek.
 On the second episode of Monty Python's Flying Circus, in the sketch "The Mouse Problem", a list of famous people who secretly were mice is concluded with "and, of course, Hilaire Belloc".

See also

 Hilaire Belloc bibliography
 Mr. Belloc Objects to "The Outline of History" – H.G.Wells' dispute with Belloc
 Hilaire Belloc – Wikiquote

Works
 "A Last Word on Calderon," The Irish Monthly, Vol. 19, No. 219, Sep. 1891.
 "A Conscript’s View of the French Army," The Contemporary Review, Vol. LXIII, June 1893.
 "The Liberal Tradition." In Essays in Liberalism, Cassell & Company, 1897.
 "'Democracy and Liberty' Reviewed," The Catholic World, Vol. LXVI, October 1897/March 1898.
 "The Historian," The Living Age, Vol. IX, October/December 1900.
 "The Sea-Fight of Ushant," Scribner's, Vol. XXXIV, No. 2, August 1903.
 "The Cambridge History of the French Revolution," The Bookman, Vol. XXVI, No. 156, September 1904.
 "The Protectionist Movement in England," The International Quarterly, Vol. X, October 1904/January 1905.
 "The Young Napoleon," The Bookman, Vol. XXVIII, No. 166, July 1905.
 "Napoleon II," The Bookman, Vol. XXIX, No. 170, November 1905.
 "Catholics and the Education Bill" 1906.
 "Ten Pages of Taine," The International Quarterly, Vol. XII, October 1905/January 1906.
 "Contemporary France," The Bookman, Vol. XXIX, No. 173, February 1906.
 "Thoughts About Modern Thought," The New Age, Vol. II, No. 6, 7 December 1907.
 "Limits of Direct Taxation," The Contemporary Review, Vol. XCIII, February 1908.
 "Not a Reply," The New Age, Vol. II, No. 15, 8 February 1908.
 "A Question," The New Age, Vol. II, No. 21, 21 March 1908.
 "The Inflation of Assessment," The Dublin Review, Vol. CXLII, No. 284-285, January/April 1908.
 "The Recess and the Congo," The New Age, Vol. III, No. 15, 8 August 1908.
 "The Taxation of Rent," The Dublin Review, Vol. CXLV, No. 290-291, July/October 1909.
 "The International. I. The Ferrer Case," The Dublin Review, Vol. CXLVI, No. 292-293, January/April 1910.
 "The International. II. The Motive Case," The Dublin Review, Vol. CXLVI, No. 292-293, January/April 1910.
  as part of "The Home University Library of Modern Knowledge," Henry Holt and Company, 1911
 "Lord Acton on the French Revolution," The Nineteenth Century and After, Vol. LXIX, January/June 1911.
 "The Economics of ‘Cheap’," The Dublin Review, Vol. CXLVIII, No. 296-297, January/April 1911.
 "The Catholic Conscience of History," The Catholic World, Vol. XCII, October 1910/March 1911.
 "What was the Roman Empire?," The Catholic World, Vol. XCII, October 1910/March 1911.
 "What was the Church in the Roman Empire?," The Catholic World, Vol. XCII, October 1910/March 1911.
 "What was the ‘Fall’ of the Roman Empire?," The Catholic World, Vol. XCII, October 1910/March 1911.
 "The Beginnings of the Nations," The Catholic World, Vol. XCII, October 1910/March 1911.
 "What Happened in Britain," Part II, The Catholic World, Vol. XCIII, April/September 1911.
 "The Middle Ages," The Catholic World, Vol. XCIII, April/September 1911.
 "The Dark Ages," The Catholic World, Vol. XCIII, No. 556, April/September 1911.
 "On a Method of Writing History," The Dublin Review, Vol. CXLIX, No. 298-299, July/October 1911.
 "Catholicism and History," The Dublin Review, Vol. CXLIX, No. 298-299, July/October 1911.
 "What was the Reformation?," Part II, The Catholic World, Vol. XCIV, October 1911/March 1912.
 "The Results of the Reformation," Part II, The Catholic World, Vol. XCIV, October 1911/March 1912.
 "The Entry Into the Dark Ages," The Dublin Review, Vol. CL, No. 300-301, January/April 1912.
 "On a Very Special Calling," The Century Magazine, Vol. LXXXIV, No. 1, May 1912.
 "The Fairy Omnibus," The Century Magazine, Vol. LXXXIV, No. 3, July 1912.
 "On the Secret of Diplomatic Success," The Century Magazine, Vol. LXXXIV, No°. 6, October 1912.
 "The Servile State," Everyman, Vol. I, No. 7, 29 November 1912.
 "On a Great Wind." In A Century of Great Essays, J. M. Dent & Sons, 1913.
 "Should Lloyd George Imitate Napoleon?," Everyman, Vol. I, No. 23, 21 March 1913.
 "The Battle of Waterloo," Everyman, Vol. II, No. 27, 18 April 1913.
 "Professor Bury’s History of Freedom of Thought," The Dublin Review, Vol. CLIV, No. 308-309, January/April 1914.
 "The Church and French Democracy," Part II, Part III, Part IV, Part V, The Catholic World, Vol. XCVIII, October 1913/March 1914; Part VI, Vol. XCIX, April/September 1914.
 "The Modern French Temper," The Dublin Review, Vol. CLV, No. 310-311, July/October 1914.
 The Historic Thames, Wayfarers Library, J.M. Dent & Sons, 1914.
 "The Geography of the War," The Geographical Journal, Vol. 45, No. 1, Jan. 1915.
 "High Lights of the French Revolution," The Century Magazine, Vol. LXXXVIII, No. 5, September 1914; Part II, No. 6, October 1914; Part III, Vol. LXXXIX, No. 2, December 1914; Part IV, N°. 4, February 1915; Part V, N°. 6, April 1915.
 "The Economics of War," The Dublin Review, Vol. CLVI, No. 312-313, January/April 1915.
 "Certain Social Tendencies of the War," The New Age, Vol. XIX, No. 8, 1916, pp. 174–175.
 "A Page of Gibbon," The Dublin Review, Vol. CLIX, No. 314-315, July/October 1916.
 "The Re-creation of Property," The New Age, Vol. XX, No. 6, 1916, pp. 125–127.
 "The Present Position and Power of the Press," The New Age, Vol. XX, No. 7, 1916, pp. 150–151.
 "The Present Position and Power of the Press," The New Age, Vol. XX, No. 8, 1916, pp. 173–175.
 "The Present Position and Power of the Press," The New Age, Vol. XX, No. 9, 1916, pp. 197–199.
 "The Present Position and Power of the Press," The New Age, Vol. XX, No. 10, 1917, pp. 221–222.
 "The Press," The New Age, Vol. XX, No. 10, 1917, p. 237.
 "The Present Position and Power of the Press," The New Age, Vol. XX, No. 11, 1917, pp. 245–246.
 "The Present Position and Power of the Press," The New Age, Vol. XX, No. 12, 1917, pp. 271–272.
 "The Present Position and Power of the Press," The New Age, Vol. XX, No. 13, 1917, p. 294.
 "The Present Position and Power of the Press," The New Age, Vol. XX, No. 14, 1917, pp. 317–318.
 "A Landmark," The New Age, Vol. XX, No. 22, 1917, pp. 509–510.
 "Socialism and the Servile State," The Catholic World, Vol. CV, April/September 1917.
 "The Priest," The Catholic World, Vol. CV, April/September 1917.
 "A Preface to Gibbon," Studies: An Irish Quarterly Review, Vol. 6, No. 24, Dec. 1917.
 "A Political Survey," Land & Water, Vol. LXX, No. 2904, January 1918.
 "The Prime Minister’s Speech," Land & Water, Vol. LXX, No. 2905, January 1918.
 "The New State in Europe," Part III; Part IV, Land and Water, No. 2909, February 1918.
 "Enemy Reinforcement," Land and Water, Vol. LXX, No. 2910, February 1918.
 "The Meaning of Ukraine," Land and Water, Vol. LXX, No. 2911, February 1918.
 "German War Medals," Land and Water, Vol. LXX, No. 2911, February 1918.
 "The Public Mood," Land and Water, Vol. LXX, No. 2912, February 1918.
 "The German Offer," Land and Water, Vol. LXX, No. 2913, March 1918.
 "East and West," Land and Water, Vol. LXX, No. 2914, March 1918.
 "The Great Battle," Land and Water, Vol. LXX, No. 2916, March 1918; Part II, Vol. LXXI, No. 2917, April 1918.
 "The Continued Battle," Land and Water, Vol. LXXI, No. 2918, April 1918.
 "Battle of the Lys," Land and Water, Vol. LXXI, No. 2919, April 1918.
 "The American Effort," Land and Water, Vol. LXXI, No. 2921, May 1918.
 "The Delay and the Attack," Land and Water, Vol. LXXI, No. 2925, May 1918.
 "Battle of the Tardenois," Land and Water, Vol. LXXI, No. 2926, June 1918.
 "Battle of the Matz," Land and Water, Vol. LXXI, No. 2929, June 1918.
 "The Distributist State," Part II, The Catholic World, Vol. CVI, October 1917/March 1918.
 "Gibbon and the True Cross," Studies: An Irish Quarterly Review, Vol. 7, No. 26, Jun. 1918.
 "Gibbon and the Temporal Power," Studies: An Irish Quarterly Review, Vol. 7, No. 27, Sep. 1918.
 "On the Word ‘Christianity’," The Catholic World, Vol. CVII, April/September 1918.
 "State Arbitration in Peril." In The Limits of State Industrial Control, J. M. Dent & Son Ltd., 1919.
 "The Recovery of Europe," The Lotus Magazine, Vol. 10, No. 1, Jan. 1919; Part II, Vol. 10, No. 2, Feb. 1919.
 "A Visit to Strassburg," The Living Age, Vol. XIV, No. 693, April 1919.
 "Vanished Towns," The Living Age, Vol. 14, No. 709, May 1919.
 "Paris and London – A Study in Contrasts," The Living Age, September 1919.
 "Three British Criticisms of Ludendorff," The Living Age, November 1919.
 "Gibbon and Julian the Apostate," Studies: An Irish Quarterly Review, Vol. 8, No. 32, Dec. 1919.
 "An Essay on Controversy," The Living Age, March 1920.
 "Cursing the Climate," The Living Age, March 1920.
 "The House of Commons," The New Age, Vol. XXVI, No. 12, 1920, pp. 183–184.
 "The House of Commons: II," The New Age, Vol. XXVI, No. 13, 1920, pp. 197–199.
 "The House of Commons: III," The New Age, Vol. XXVI, No. 14, 1920, pp. 216–218.
 "The House of Commons: IV," The New Age, Vol. XXVI, No. 15, 1920, pp. 233–235.
 "The House of Commons: V," The New Age, Vol. XXVI, No. 16, 1920, pp. 249–250.
 "The House of Commons: VI," The New Age, Vol. XXVI, No. 17, 1920, pp. 265–267.
 "The House of Commons: VIII," The New Age, Vol. XXVI, No. 18, 1920, pp. 285–287.
 "The House of Commons: IX," The New Age, Vol. XXVI, No. 20, 1920, pp. 316–318.
 "The House of Commons: X," The New Age, Vol. XXVI, No. 21, 1920, pp. 333–335.
 "The House of Commons: XI," The New Age, Vol. XXVI, No. 22, 1920, pp. 348–340.
 "The House of Commons: XII," The New Age, Vol. XXVI, No. 23, 1920, pp. 364–365.
 "The House of Commons: XIII," The New Age, Vol. XXVI, No. 24, 1920, pp. 380–383.
 "The House of Commons: XIV," The New Age, Vol. XXVII, No. 2, 1920, pp. 21–24.
 "The Led," The New Age, Vol. XXVII, No. 4, 1920, pp. 52–53.
 "An Example," The New Age, Vol. XXVII, No. 9, 1920, pp. 133–134.
 "On Accent," The Living Age, June 1920.
 "An Analysis of the 'Lettres Provinciales'," Studies: An Irish Quarterly Review, Vol. 9, No. 35, Sep. 1920.
 "Madame Tussaud and Her Famous Waxworks," The Living Age, September 1920.
 "On Progress," Studies: An Irish Quarterly Review, Vol. 9, No. 36, Dec. 1920.
 "The Mowing of a Field." In Modern Essays, Harcourt, Brace & Company. New York, 1921.
 "The Death of St. Martin," The Living Age, February 1921.
 "Dante the Monarchist," The Catholic World, Vol. CXIII, September 1921.
 "On Foreign Affairs," The New Age, Vol. XXIX, No. 22, 1921, pp. 257–258.
 "On Foreign Affairs: II," The New Age, Vol. XXIX, No. 23, 1921, pp. 268–269.
 "On Foreign Affairs: III," The New Age, Vol. XXIX, No. 24, 1921, pp. 279–280.
 "On Foreign Affairs: IV," The New Age, Vol. XXIX, No. 25, 1921, pp. 291–293.
 "Question and Answer," The New Age, Vol. XXIX, No. 26, 1921, p. 304.
 "Gibbon and the Ebionites," The Dublin Review, Vol. CLXIX, No. 339, October/December 1921.
 "On the Approach of an Awful Doom." In Modern English Essays, J. M. Dent & Sons. London, 1922.
 "On a Unknown Country." In Modern English Essays, J. M. Dent & Sons. London, 1922.
 "On Kind Hearts Being More Than Coronets," The Living Age, July 1922.
 "Al Wasal, or the Merger," The Living Age, Vol. CCCXV, No. 4093, 16 December 1922.
"The Jews," 1922.
 "The American Alliance," The Living Age, June 1923.
 "On the Cathedral at Seville and 'The Misantrophe'," The Bookman, Vol. LVIII, No. 4, December 1923.
 "Hoko and Moko," The Living Age, February 1924.
 "A Catholic View of Religious America," The Century Magazine, April 1924.
 "Wash Day – British and American Style," The Outlook, April 1924.
 "A Pedestrian in Spain," The Living Age, November 1924.
 "Gibbon and the First Council of Ephesus," Studies: An Irish Quarterly Review, Vol. 13, No. 51, Sep. 1924; Part II, Vol. 13, No. 52, Dec. 1924.
 "Nordic or Not?," The Living Age, April 1925.
 "A Chinese Litany of Odd Numbers," The Living Age, June 1925.
 "Mrs. Piozzi’s Rasselas," The Saturday Review, Vol. II, No. 3, August 1925.
 "The Reproof of Gluttony," The Forum, Vol. LXXVI, No. 3, September 1926.
 "Vathek," The Saturday Review, Vol. IV, No. 12, October 1927.
 "Carlyle's French Revolution." In Modern Essays, Selected by Norman G. Brett-James, Dutton, 1930.
 "The Peril to Letters," The Living Age, January 1930.
 "Advice to a Young Man," The Living Age, March 1930.
 "Mark My Words!," The Saturday Review, Vol. VII, No. 34, March 1931.
 "On Translation," The Living Age, September/October 1931.
 "Machine versus Man," The Living Age, June 1932.
 "Britain’s Secret Policy," The Living Age, December 1932.
 "The Restoration of Property," The American Review, April–November 1933.
 "Man and the Machine." In Science in the Changing World, George Allen & Unwin Ltd., 1933.
 "Science and Religion," The American Review, Vol. II, No. 4, February 1934.
 "Parliament and Monarchy," The American Review, Vol. II, No. 5, March 1934.
 "Dimnet and the French Mind," The Saturday Review, Vol.  XI, No. 36, March 1935.
 "Gilbert Keith Chesterton," The Saturday Review, Vol. XVI, No. 10, July 1936.
 "G. K. Chesterton and Modern England," Studies: An Irish Quarterly Review, Vol. 25, No. 99, Sep. 1936.
 "The New League," The American Review, Vol. VIII, No. 1, November 1936.
 "A Letter to Bernard Shaw," The American Review, Vol. VIII, No. 3, January 1937.
 "English Monarchy," The American Review, Vol. VIII, No. 4, February 1937.
 "Two Texts," The American Review, Vol. IX, No. 1, April 1937.
 "Neither Capitalism Nor Socialism," The American Mercury, Vol. XLI, No. 163, July 1937.
 "The Way Out," Social Justice, February 1938.
 "The Problem Stated," Social Justice, March 1938.
 "The Wage Worker," Social Justice, March 1938.
 "Insufficiency and Insecurity," Social Justice, March 1938.
 "Ruin of the Small Owner," Social Justice, March 1938.
 "Ruin of the Small Store Keeper," Social Justice, April 1938.
 "The Proletarian Mind," Social Justice, April 1938.
 "Usury," Social Justice, April 1938.
 "The Disease of Monopoly," Social Justice, April 1938.
 "Capitalism Kills Its Own Market," Social Justice, May 1938.
 "The Suppressed Truth," Social Justice, May 1938.
 "The End Is Slavery," Social Justice, May 1938.
 "The Way Out," Social Justice, June 1938.
 "Communism – the Theory," Social Justice, June 1938.
 "Communism Is Wicked," Social Justice, June 1938.
 "Communism Has Failed," Social Justice, June 1938.
 "Property," Social Justice, July 1938.
 "Secured Capitalism," Social Justice, July 1938.
 "The Way Out," Social Justice, July 1938.
 "The Way Out: The Differential Tax," Social Justice, July 1938.
 "The Way Out: The Guild System," Social Justice, August 1938.
 "The Way Out: The Small Producer," Social Justice, August 1938.
 "The Small Distributor," Social Justice, August 1938.
 "The Way Out: The Functions of the State," Social Justice, August 1938.
 "The Way Out: Summary and Conclusion," Social Justice, August 1938.
 "Prussia Not Hitler Must Perish," The Living Age, January 1940.
 "An English Need," The Irish Monthly, Vol. 68, No. 804, Jun. 1940.
 "Hitler Loses Round One," The Living Age, December 1940.

Miscellany
 James Anthony Froude, Essays in Literature and History, with an introduction by Hilaire Belloc, J.M. Dent & Sons, 1906.
 Thomas Carlyle, The French Revolution: A History, with an introduction by Hilaire Belloc, J.M. Dent & Sons, 1906.
 Johannes Jörgensen, Lourdes, with a preface by Hilaire Belloc, Longmans, Green & Co., 1914.
 Hoffman Nickerson, The Inquisition, with a preface by Hilaire Belloc, John Bale, Sons & Danielsson Ltd., 1923.
 P. G. Wodehouse, (ed.), "On Conversations in Trains." In A Century of Humour, Hutchinson & Co., 1934.
 Brian Magee, The English Recusants, with an introduction by Hilaire Belloc, Burns Oates & Washbourne Ltd., 1938.
 C. John McCloskey, (ed.), The Essential Belloc: A Prophet for Our Times, Saint Benedict Press, 2010.

Notes

References

 Belloc, Hilaire. "Europe and the faith" "archive.org"
 Boyd, Ian. "Hilaire Belloc: the Myth and the Man," The Tablet, 12 July 2003.
 Boyle, David. "Hilaire Belloc and the Liberal Revival: Distributism: An Alternative Liberal Tradition?", Journal of Liberal History, Issue 40, Autumn 2003.
 Braybrooke, Patrick. Some Thoughts on Hilaire Belloc, Drane's, 1924.
 Cooney, Anthony. Hilaire Belloc: 1870–1953, Third Way Movement Ltd., 1998.
 Corrin, Jay P. G. K. Chesterton & Hilaire Belloc: The Battle Against Modernity, Ohio University Press, 1991.
 Coyne, Edward J. "Mr. Belloc on Usury," Studies: An Irish Quarterly Review, Vol. 21, No. 82, Jun. 1932.
 Feske, Victor. From Belloc to Churchill: Private Scholars, Public Culture and the Crisis of British Liberalism 1900–1939, University of North Carolina Press, 1996.
 Fytton, Francis. "After Belloc: Who?," The Irish Monthly, Vol. 83, No. 967, Mar. 1954.
 Fytton, Francis. "In Defence of Belloc," The Irish Monthly, Vol. 83, No. 973, Sep. 1954.
 Gardner, A. G. "Mr. Hilaire Belloc." In Pillars of Society, James Nisbet, 1913.
 Hamilton, Robert. Hilaire Belloc; An Introduction to his Spirit and Work, Douglas Organ, 1945.
 Haynes, Renée. Hilaire Belloc, British Council and the National Book League, 1953.
  Kelly, Hugh. "Hilaire Belloc: Catholic Champion: In Commemoration of His Seventieth Birthday," Studies: An Irish Quarterly Review, Vol. 30, No. 117, Mar. 1941.
 Kelly, Hugh. "Centenary of Hilaire Belloc," Studies: An Irish Quarterly Review, Vol. 59, No. 236, Winter, 1970.
 Kilmer, Joyce. "The Poetry of Hilaire Belloc," Prose Works, Vol. 2, George H. Doran Company, 1918.
 Leo, Brother. "Hilaire Belloc, Initiator," The Catholic World, Vol. CXII, March 1921.
 Longaker, Mark. "Bias and Brilliance: Mr. Hilaire Belloc," Contemporary Biography, University of Pennsylvania Press, 1934.
 Lowndes, Marie Belloc. The Young Hilaire Belloc, Some Records of Youth and Middle Age, P. J. Kennedy & Sons, 1956.
 McCarthy, John P. "Hilaire Belloc and the French Revolution," Modern Age, Spring 1993.
 MacManus, Francis. "Mr. Belloc's England," The Irish Monthly, Vol. 64, No. 757, Jul. 1936.
 Mandell, C. Creighton and Shanks, Edward. Hilaire Belloc, the Man and his Work, Methuen & Co., 1916.
 Maynard, Theodore. "The Chesterbelloc," Part II, Part III, Part IV, The Catholic World, Vol. CX, October 1919/March 1920.
 McCarthy, John P. Hilaire Belloc: Edwardian Radical, Liberty Press, 1978.
 Morton, J. B. Hilaire Belloc: A Memoir, Hollis & Carter, 1955.
 Pearce, Joseph. Old Thunder: A Life of Hilaire Belloc, HarperCollins, 2002.
 Rich, Tim. "On a Monkey's Birthday: Belloc and Sussex." In Common Ground: Around Britain in Thirty Writers, Cyan Books, 2006 .
 Rope, H. E. G. "My Memory of Hilaire Belloc," The Irish Monthly, Vol. 81, No. 962, Oct. 1953.
 Schall, James V. "Belloc’s Infamous Phrase," The Catholic Thing, 18 October 2011.
 Semper, I. J. A Study of Four Outstanding Books of Christian Apologetics, Columbia College Library, 1928.
 Sherbo, Arthur. "Belated Justice to Hilaire Belloc, Versifier (1870–1953)," Studies in Bibliography, Vol. 45, 1992.
 Shuster, George Nauman. "The Adventures of a Historian: Hilaire Belloc." In The Catholic Spirit in Modern English Literature, The Macmillan Company, 1922.
 Speaight, Robert. The Life of Hilaire Belloc, Farrar, Straus & Cudahy, 1957.
 Stove, R. J. "Why Belloc Still Matters," The American Conservative, 13 January 2003.
 Wilhelmsen, Frederick. Hilaire Belloc: No Alienated Man. A Study in Christian Integration, Sheed and Ward, 1953.
 Wilhelmsen, Frederick. "The World of Hilaire Belloc," Modern Age, Spring 1979.
 Wilhelmsen, Frederick. "Hilaire Belloc: Old Thunder," Modern Age, Fall 1984.
 Wilhelmsen, Frederick. "Hilaire Belloc: Defender of the Faith," The Catholic Writer: The Proceedings of the Wethersfield Institute, Vol. II, 1989 [Rep. by CERC: Catholic Education Resource Center.
 Wilson, A. N. Hilaire Belloc, Atheneum, 1984 [Rep. by Gibson Square Books, 2003].
 Woodruff, Douglas, ed., For Hilaire Belloc, Sheed & Ward, 1942 [with contributions by Douglas Jerrold, Ronald Knox, Arnold Lunn, C. A. J. Armstrong, Christopher Hollis, Gervase Matthew, David Mathew, J. B. Morton, W. A. Pantin, David Jones].

External links 

 
 
 
 
 
 Works by Hilaire Belloc at Hathi Trust
 
 Catholic Authors: Hilaire Belloc
 Quotidiana: Hilaire Belloc
 Hilaire Belloc, The rise of the capitalist state (1912)
 Hilaire Belloc Papers at Boston College

1870 births
1953 deaths
19th-century English poets
19th-century French essayists
19th-century French male writers
19th-century French poets
20th-century English male writers
20th-century English poets
20th-century French essayists
Alumni of Balliol College, Oxford
Anti-Masonry
Hilaire
British anti-capitalists
British humorous poets
Burials in Sussex
Children's poets
Christian critics of Islam
Christian radicals
Christian humanists
Contributors to the Catholic Encyclopedia
Critics of classical liberalism
Critics of Buddhism
Distributism
English Catholic poets
English essayists
English male poets
English people of French descent
English Roman Catholics
English Roman Catholic writers
English travel writers
English World War I poets
French anti-capitalists
French anti-communists
French male essayists
French male writers
French people of English descent
Historians of the French Revolution
Liberal Party (UK) MPs for English constituencies
Members of the Parliament of the United Kingdom for Salford South
Naturalised citizens of the United Kingdom
Parkes family
People educated at The Oratory School
People from Birmingham, West Midlands
People from Slindon
People from Yvelines
Presidents of the Oxford Union
Priestley family
UK MPs 1906–1910
UK MPs 1910